During the 1995–96 Dutch football season, PSV Eindhoven competed in its 40th Eredivisie tournament.

Season summary
PSV finished the season in second, one better than last season, with ten more points (once adjusting for the switch to three-points-for-a-win). The club also made its deepest run in Europe since winning the European Cup at the turn of the decade, with a 7–1 thrashing off Finnish team MyPa and a 5–3 victory at Leeds among the highlights as PSV reached the quarter-finals. A 2–2 draw at Spanish giants Barcelona gave the Dutch club a foundation for a second-leg triumph, but a late Barcelona goal gave the Catalans the victory on the night and a semi-final berth.

First-team squad
Squad at end of season

Left club during season

Transfers

Out
  Erik Meijer –  KFC Uerdingen
  Patrick Paauwe –  De Graafschap
  Peter Hoekstra –  Ajax

Loan out
  Jürgen Dirkx –  Fortuna Sittard, season
  Vampeta –  Fluminense, season

Competitions

Eredivisie

League table

Results by round

Matches

KNVB Cup

UEFA Cup

First round

PSV won 8–2 on aggregate.

Second round

PSV won 3–8 on aggregate.

Third round

PSV won 2–1 on aggregate.

Quarter-finals

Barcelona won 5–4 on aggregate.

Statistics

Players statistics

References

Notes

PSV Eindhoven seasons
PSV Eindhoven